Warrenton is an agricultural town of approximately 22,588 people in the Northern Cape province of South Africa, situated  north of Kimberley on the Vaal River.

History
In 1880, a syndicate bought the western portion of the farm Grasbult to irrigate the fertile land and produce vegetables for the diamond fields. The town which grew here was named after Sir Charles Warren. Diamonds were discovered here in 1888 and mining continued to 1926.

Geography

The town lies just downstream of the Vaalharts Dam, which supplies water to the Vaalharts Irrigation Scheme.

The N12 national route, the main route from Kimberley to Gauteng, passes through Warrenton, and the N18 national route to Mahikeng and Botswana stars there.

The main Cape Town–Kimberley–Johannesburg railway line also passes through the town, and the line to Mahikeng and Botswana branches off at Fourteen Streams, on the north bank of the Vaal opposite Warrenton.

Demographics
In the 2011 Census the population of Warrenton, including the township of Ikutseng, was recorded as 22,588 people living in 5,615 households. 80% of the residents described themselves as "Black African", 14% as "Coloured", 5% as "White", and 1% as "Indian or Asian". 67% of the residents of the town speak Setswana as their first language, while 22% speak Afrikaans, 4% speak Xhosa and 2% speak Sotho.

Government
The municipal council is controlled by an African National Congress majority; the mayor is Neo Mase.

References

External links
 Warrenton at the Northern Cape Tourism Authority website

Populated places established in 1880
Populated places in the Magareng Local Municipality
Mining communities in South Africa
Vaal River
1880 establishments in South Africa